Fromage blanc (also known as maquée) is a fresh cheese originating from the north of France and southern Belgium. The name means "white cheese" in French. Fromage frais ("fresh cheese") differs from fromage blanc in that, according to French legislation, fromage frais must contain live cultures when sold, whereas with fromage blanc, fermentation has been halted.

Fromage blanc is a creamy soft cheese made with whole or skimmed milk and cream. It is a semi-fluid, creamy, viscous paste. Pure fromage blanc is virtually fat free, but cream is frequently added to improve the flavour, which also increases the fat content, frequently to as high as 8% of total weight.

Fromage blanc can be served either as a dessert similar to yogurt, frequently with added fruit, spread on bread, usually over or under jam, or used in savoury dishes. In many Western countries, fromage blanc is sold in supermarkets alongside yogurts.

See also
 List of French cheeses
 Faisselle

References

Fermented dairy products
Acid-set cheeses
Spreads (food)